More of the Night is the fifteenth studio album by American R&B/Soul group The Whispers. It was released on February 6, 1990 as the follow-up to their massively successful 1987 album, Just Gets Better with Time.  While it did not sell quite as well as its predecessor, More of the Night did include several hits, including three R&B top 10 tunes: "My Heart Your Heart," "Innocent," and "Is it Good to You."  The album went Gold.

Written by Gary Taylor, "My Heart Your Heart" was originally performed in 1988 by Taylor himself, with exactly the same musical backing and arrangement used here, and appeared as a bonus track on his Compassion album. Taylor actually produced the version by The Whispers, who turned it into a big hit.

Track listing (compact disc) 

 "More Of The Night" (Joel Davis) (6:02)
 "My Heart Your Heart" (Gary Taylor) (5:19)
 "Mind Blowing" (Robert Brookins, Gordon P. Jones, Dianne Quander) (4:55)
 "Don't Be Late For Love" (Ferguson, Lindsey, Jenkins) (5:12)
 "You Are the One" (Joel Davis) (5:26)
 "Is It Good To You" (Tsuyoshi "Taka" Takayanagi, Kevin Spencer) (6:16)
 "Innocent" (Brookins, Jones, King) (5:16)
 "Girl Don't Make Me Wait" (Zack Harmon, Christopher Troy) (4:26)
 "Misunderstanding" (Steve Russell, Rodney Benford) (5:48)
 "Forever Lover" (Greg Dalton) (4:49)
 "Babes" (Riddler, C. Romance) (4:14)
 "I Want 2B the 1 4U" (Skylark) (4:06)
 "Help Them See the Light" (Jerry McNeil) (5:24)
 "Innocent" (Heat of the Heat Edit) (Robert Brookins, Gordon P. Jones, Marva King) (4:37)

Track listing (cassette) 

Side One: Dancin
 "Innocent" (Brookins, Jones, King) (5:16)
 "Girl Don't Make Me Wait" (Zack Harmon, Christopher Troy) (4:26)
 "Misunderstanding" (Steve Russell, Rodney Benford) (5:48)
 "Forever Lover" (Greg Dalton) (4:49)
 "Babes" (Riddler, C. Romance) (4:14)
 "I Want 2B the 1 4U" (Skylark) (4:06)
 "Innocent" (Heat of the Heat Edit) (Robert Brookins, Gordon P. Jones, Marva King) (4:37)

Side Two: Romancin
 "More Of The Night" (Joel Davis) (6:02)
 "My Heart Your Heart" (Gary Taylor) (5:19)
 "Mind Blowing" (Robert Brookins, Gordon P. Jones, Dianne Quander) (4:55)
 "Don't Be Late For Love" (Ferguson, Lindsey, Jenkins) (5:12)
 "You Are the One" (Joel Davis) (5:26)
 "Is It Good To You" (Tsuyoshi "Taka" Takayanagi, Kevin Spencer) (6:16)
 "Help Them See the Light" (Jerry McNeil) (5:24)

Track listing (vinyl) 
 The vinyl version of More of the Night had a radically different track listing with songs in a different order and five songs that only appeared on the cassette and compact disc formats.
 
 "Innocent" (Brookins, Jones, King) (5:16)
 "Girl Don't Make Me Wait" (Zack Harmon, Christopher Troy) (4:26)
 "Misunderstanding" (Steve Russell, Rodney Benford) (5:48)
 "Forever Lover" (Greg Dalton) (4:49)
 "Babes" (Riddler, C. Romance) (4:14)
 "More of the Night" (Joel Davis) (6:02)
 "My Heart Your Heart" (Gary Taylor) (5:19)
 "Mind Blowing" (Robert Brookins, Jones, Dianne Quander) (4:55)
 "Is It Good To You" (Tsuyoshi "Taka" Takayanagi, Kevin Spencer) (6:16)

Charts

Weekly charts

Year-end charts

References 

1990 albums
The Whispers albums